
Gmina Wilamowice is an urban-rural gmina (administrative district) in Bielsko County, Silesian Voivodeship, in southern Poland.
It is known for the Wymysorys language, which is spoken by some of the people here.

Villages
Apart from the town of Wilamowice, Gmina Wilamowice contains the villages and settlements of Dankowice, Hecznarowice, Pisarzowice, Stara Wieś and Zasole Bielańskie.

Neighbouring gminas
Gmina Wilamowice is bordered by the city of Bielsko-Biała and by the gminas of Bestwina, Brzeszcze, Kęty, Kozy and Miedźna.

Twin towns – sister cities

Gmina Wilamowice is twinned with:

 Dolní Benešov, Czech Republic
 Horná Súča, Slovakia
 Kisújszállás, Hungary
 Klanjec, Croatia
 Kloštar Ivanić, Croatia
 Kunerad, Slovakia
 Rajecké Teplice, Slovakia
 Trenčianske Teplice, Slovakia
 Županja, Croatia

References

Wilamowice
Bielsko County